Discovery Medicine is an open-access medical journal established in 2001. It is abstracted and indexed in MEDLINE/PubMed. The editor-in-chief is Noel R. Rose (Johns Hopkins University School of Medicine). According to the Journal Citation Reports, the journal has a 2016 impact factor of 2.400.

References

External links 

General medical journals
English-language journals
Open access journals
Monthly journals
Publications established in 2001